"Wasted Love" is a song by French DJ duo Ofenbach featuring vocals by Lagique. It was released through Ofenbach Music and Warner Music on 8 January 2021.

Music video
The music video was released on 8 January 2021. It is set at night on the rainy streets of Kiev, with two people in love trying to find one another.

Track listing

Charts

Weekly charts

Year-end charts

Certifications

References

2021 songs
2021 singles
Number-one singles in Poland
Ofenbach (DJs) songs